Blagoveschensk State Pedagogical University (BSPU) is located in Blagoveschensk, the administrative center of the Amur Oblast. The city of Blagoveschensk was founded in 1856 and is one of the most important administrative, cultural, scientific, and industrial centers of the Russian Far East region; with more than 220,000 inhabitants. Blagoveschensk is often called “The Gate to China” for its unique location on the border with China. The Chinese city Heihe is located directly across the river Amur, and many Chinese companies work in the Amur region in the timber industry, agriculture, construction, and tourism.

About the University 
BSPU was founded in 1930 and is one of the oldest educational institutions in the Far East of Russia. There are over 400 faculty members and about 6,000 students within 10 departments, across 35 specialties. The university also has 14 postgraduate courses; both of pedagogical and non-pedagogical specializations. The university library was the only scientific library in Amur region before 1955. It currently hosts more than 600,000 copies. There are 6 reading halls which can seat 600 people. In 2004 with the help of the Heihe Institute, the library opened the class of Chinese studies, where students can read Chinese newspapers, watch Chinese movies and practice their pronunciation skills. There are 19 computer classes with Internet access and modern multimedia equipment.

Additionally, BSPU has its own printing office and 20 scientific laboratories and research centers, including a chemical laboratory of hetero-organic substances, laboratory of modern educational technologies, the center of environmental studies, an archeological museum, the center of linguistics and communication, and an insect laboratory. The university has established a strong partnership with leading Russian universities and scientific centers, such as Moscow State University, Moscow State Pedagogical University, and Far Eastern State University .

International Cooperation 
BSPU has relations with the Chinese educational institutions of Heihe Institute, Changchun University, Harbin Pedagogical University, Harbin University, Far-Eastern University of Finances and Economics, Daqing Pedagogical Institute, Harbin Institute of Technology, Beijing University of Language and Culture and others. There are regular student exchanges, joint scientific, cultural, and sports activities. More than 100 international students study Russian language at BSPU every year.

In 2009, BSPU, with the financial support of the "Russian world" Foundation, opened Russian language centers at 5 universities located in the Far-East of China.

In 2007, Confucius Institute was established at BSPU. 

BSPU and Heihe Institute are engaged in a joint bachelor's degree project in Philology, where Chinese students study for 2 years in Heihe and 2 years in Blagoveschensk. As a result, they obtain two diplomas, one Russian and one Chinese.

In February 2006, BSPU established a Language Testing Center where foreigners can take a Test of Russian as Foreign Language(TORFL). 

BSPU also has strong scientific and educational ties with Europe and the United States. In 1996 with the help of DAAD (German Service of Academic Exchanges), the university established Goethe Center where students acquaint themselves with modern and classical German literature, attend lectures given by German specialists, and improve their language skills.

In August 2005 BSPU joined the consortium of Russian universities engaged in a distance learning project started by the Institute for International Studies at Stanford University (USA). Russian students study international relations, political science, and environmental issues. The best students take part in annual international student conferences. In June 2005 BSPU became a member of the university network collaborating with the Department of Culture and Cooperation of the French Embassy in Russia. BSPU established a Resource Center of French Language and Culture that provides students and professors with training aids and up-to-date information on educational and cultural programs organized by the French Embassy. Students often take language courses in China, Great Britain, America, or Germany during summer vacation.

Departments 

Department of Physics and Mathematics:
Teacher of Physics and Mathematics
Teacher of Computer Science and Mathematics
Teacher of Physics and Computer Science 
Teacher of Computer Science and Translator in IT sphere
Mathematician-Programmer
Engineer

Department of Natural Sciences and Geography:
Teacher of Geography and Biology
Teacher of Biology and Chemistry
Department of History and Philology:
Historian, Teacher of History
Teacher of Russian Language and Literature
Russian as a Foreign Language

Department of Pedagogics and Elementary Education:
Teacher of Elementary School
Teacher-Logopedist
Teacher of Pre-School Pedagogics and Psychology
Oligophrenopedagogics
Psychologist in Corrective Educational Institutions

Department of Foreign Languages:
Teacher of Foreign Languages, Interpreter:
English as Primary and French as Secondary,
French as Primary and English as Secondary,
English as Primary and German as Secondary,
German as Primary and English as Secondary,
Chinese as Primary and English as Secondary,
English as Primary and Chinese as Secondary

Department of Physical Culture and Sport:
Teacher of Physical Culture
Specialist in Physical Culture and Sport
Specialist in Life Security

Department of Industry and Pedagogics:
Arts and Crafts
Clothing Designer
Technology and Design of Materials
The technology of Ready-Made Garments

Department of Psychology and Pedagogics:
Teacher-Psychologist
Manager and Translator in Business Economics

International Department (for foreign students):
Teacher of Russian as a foreign language

Department of History and Philology:

Post-Graduate Studies 

Russian History
World History
Physics of Conductors and Dielectrics
Chemical Physics
Chemistry of Hetero-Organic Substances
Russian Literature
Russian Language
Germanic Languages
Romanic Languages
Physical Geography
Soil Science
General Pedagogics
History of Pedagogics
Theory and Methodology of Education
Culture Studies

References

External links 

 Official site of Blagoveschensk State Pedagogical University
 Russian Union of Rectors

Buildings and structures in Amur Oblast
Universities in the Russian Far East
Blagoveshchensk
Teachers colleges in Russia
1930 establishments in Russia
Educational institutions established in 1930
Universities and institutes established in the Soviet Union
Cultural heritage monuments in Amur Oblast
Objects of cultural heritage of Russia of regional significance